Bamboo was a Filipino alternative rock band formed in 2003 by lead vocalist Bamboo Mañalac, bassist Nathan Azarcon, lead and rhythm guitarist Ira Cruz and drummer Vic Mercado.

Band origin
Francisco "Bamboo" Mañalac serves as the band's frontman. Ira Cruz, the band's guitarist claimed that the name of the band was not just derived from their vocalist's name but also from the word bamboo, the characteristics of which are associated with strength and durability with an island feel to it. Also, it's very Filipino and Asian at the same time.

Two of its members, Bamboo Mañalac and Nathan Azarcon, were formerly part of Rivermaya. The other two members, Ira Cruz and Vic Mercado, were former instrumentalists of another band, Passage. Cruz and Azarcon were also former members of the band Kapatid during that time.

Four years after their departure from Rivermaya, Mañalac and Azarcon caught up again with each other, during which Azarcon introduced him to Cruz and Mercado.

Music career

Bamboo's debut album, As The Music Plays, was released in February 2004, where it received positive response from fans and critics alike. The album also won numerous awards at the AWIT Awards, NU 107 Rock Awards, and MTV Pilipinas 2004. and a repackaged version release on October 25, 2004.

Their second album, Light Peace Love, which was released on June 4, 2005, consists of ten songs with differing moods and subjects, and took only 3 months to record. This album has a softer sound with both its lyrics and delivery. For this album, the band added more strings and a variety of other instruments, including trumpets. The band admitted that this album had a personal feel to it. They experimented with several new styles that may please new listeners, at the risk of disappointing fans of the more conventional rock of their first album.

on 2005, the band represents the Philippines at EMI Music Southeast Asia three-day annual regional conference in Singapore

Their third album, We Stand Alone Together, was released on February 16, 2007. It contains covers of local songs such as Buklod's "Tatsulok" and international songs such as Paul Simon's "50 Ways to Leave Your Lover", from different generations. It also includes bonus tracks like unplugged versions of their hit songs from previous albums such as "Mr. Clay", "These Days", and "Hallelujah". Once again, opting to do away with the conventional rock image that was attached to them, they produced sounds which were more jazzy than expected.

Star Records—backed up by ABS-CBN TV Production and MYX—produced and created the official soundtrack for the tele-epiko "Rounin", wherein the title track "Argos" was performed by Bamboo. A new avenue was opened to the band, as "Argos" is said to be the band's first venture to record a song for a primetime television show. It is also the first time for the multi-awarded band and Star Records to work together.

The band was also part of the "Days of Peace" Campaign by UNICEF with Gary Valenciano. The band's fourth album, Tomorrow Becomes Yesterday achieved platinum status on September 28, 2008 - just two days after its release.

Past members
Bamboo Mañalac – vocals
Nathan Azarcon – bass guitar, backing vocals
Ira Cruz – lead guitar, backing vocals
Vic Mercado – drums, percussion

Break-up
News circulated on January 9, 2011, that Bamboo had "allegedly disbanded". DJ KC Montero of Wave 89.1 confirmed the breakup on Wave's The KC Show and via Twitter. Montero clarified that all the members of the band "have decided to move on," and that he does not know why they called it quits. The group has not released an official statement on the issue, according to ABS-CBNNews.com. On January 11, 2011, Bamboo's lead vocalist Francisco "Bamboo" Mañalac finally confirmed the breakup of his band in an official statement posted on the group's website.

Aftermath
A few months after the band disbanded, the group reformed without the vocalist (Bamboo Mañalac) and formed the band Hijo composed of Nathan Azarcon (vocals & bass), Ira Cruz (guitar), Vic Mercado (drums), Junji Lerma of Wahijuara (guitar) and Jay-O Orduña of Cauio (keyboards and backing vocals).

The band's frontman Bamboo Mañalac pursued a solo career and released his first album as a solo artist in November 2011.

Discography

Albums
As The Music Plays (2004) - Double Platinum (A 2-disc Repackaged Version was released in 2004)
Light Peace Love (2005) - Platinum
We Stand Alone Together (2007) - Gold
Tomorrow Becomes Yesterday (2008) - Platinum (A 2-disc Repackaged Version was released in late 2010)

Compilations
Full Volume:The Best Of Pinoy Alternative (2005 Polyeast Records)
includes As The Music Plays (Jam Version)
Rounin OST (2007 Star Music) :includes Argos
Astig...The Biggest OPM Hits (2008 Universal Records)
Platinum Hits Collection (2011 Polyeast Records)''

Singles

Awards and nominations

Other media

Commercial Endorsements
Smart
Nescafé
Colt 45
Pepsi
Yamaha Motors
Tanduay Rhum T5 (with 6cyclemind, Chicosci, Kamikazee, and Sandwich)

Footnotes

References
Bamboo Official Site 
Bamboo Onlypinoy.com Profile
Vic Mercado - Zildjian
Vic Mercado - Gretsch
https://web.archive.org/web/20060325045329/http://www.philmusic.com/blog/index.php?p=114

External links
Bamboo profile at Onlypinoy.com Rock Music Updates
Bamboo on Rockstar Bembang!
Bamboo PinoyBanda Profile
Bamboo Yahoo! Music Page
Bamboo profile at EMI Philippines

Filipino rock music groups
Musical groups from Metro Manila
Musical groups established in 2003
Musical groups disestablished in 2011